The Venerable  Hayman Johnson  (29 June 1912 – 1 April 1993) was an eminent Anglican priest in the 20th century.
 
He was educated at Exeter School and New College, Oxford and ordained in 1937. After curacies in Bermondsey and Streatham he was a Chaplain in the RAFVR from 1941 to 1946. He held incumbencies at Harold Wood and Hornchurch before becoming Archdeacon of Sheffield in 1963. An Honorary Chaplain to the Queen,
he retired in 1978.

References

1912 births
1993 deaths
People educated at Exeter School
Alumni of New College, Oxford
20th-century English Anglican priests
Archdeacons of Sheffield
Honorary Chaplains to the Queen
Royal Air Force chaplains
World War II chaplains
Royal Air Force Volunteer Reserve personnel of World War II